Lindquist Lake is a freshwater lake in northeastern Wisconsin.

Statistics
Fish species include bluegill, bass, and northern pike.

Recreation
Located north of Green Bay, Wisconsin, just a few minutes east of Pembine, Wisconsin.

References

Lakes of Marinette County, Wisconsin